The 1908 United States presidential election in Virginia took place on November 3, 1908, as part of the 1908 United States presidential election. Voters chose 12 representatives, or electors to the Electoral College, who voted for president and vice president.

Virginia voted for the Democratic candidate, former U.S. Representative William J. Bryan over the Republican candidate, former Secretary of War William Howard Taft. Bryan won the state by a margin of 22.16%.

Results

Results by county

References

Virginia
1908
1908 Virginia elections